John E. Murphy Jr. (born April 3, 1943) is an American politician and lobbyist who served in the Massachusetts House of Representatives from 1971 to 1985.

Early life
Murphy was born on April 3, 1943, in Richmond, Virginia. His father, John E. Murphy also served in the House and was a Peabody District Court judge. He attended The Newman School, Providence College, and Suffolk Law School.

Politics
In 1970, Murphy was elected to the House in his first ever bid for elected office. In 1978 he became majority whip. In 1983 he was promoted to majority leader when George Keverian was removed from the position by Speaker Thomas W. McGee after Keverian decided to run for speaker himself. In 1984 Murphy lost his reelection bid by 228 votes to Republican Peter G. Torkildsen.

Lobbying
After leaving the House, Murphy practiced law and later joined Issues Management, a lobbying firm managed by former Senate President Kevin B. Harrington. In 1992 he received $130,000 from the YMCA after the organization received $12.2 million in state funds for a new building in the Boston Navy Yard. The project was criticized by The Boston Globe as by 1993, the state-of-the-art facility had a nightly occupancy rate of about 8% due to its remote location. The paper criticized Murphy's role in the deal, as the payment was never reported to the state and his fee was based on the successful completion of the project - both of which violated state law and because Murphy did not disclose the payment before a bankruptcy judge who forgave about $350,000 of Murphy's debts. By 1993 Murphy had 14 clients, which included racetracks, hospitals, a billboard company, solid waste facilities, and an electric utility. His close relationship with House Speaker Charles Flaherty was cited as a reason for his success. In 1996, Flaherty pleaded guilty to felony tax evasion and admitted to violations of state conflict of interest law for receiving free vacation housing from lobbyists. Murphy was fined $2,000 by the Massachusetts Ethics Commission for providing Flaherty with use of a vacation home.

References

1943 births
American lobbyists
Massachusetts lawyers
Members of the Massachusetts House of Representatives
People from Peabody, Massachusetts
Providence College alumni
Suffolk University Law School alumni
Living people